Roger Lindsey Donaldson  (born 15 November 1945) is an Australian-born New Zealand film director, producer and writer whose films include the 1981 relationship drama Smash Palace, and a run of titles shot in the United States, including the Kevin Costner films No Way Out (1987) and Thirteen Days (2000), and the 1997 disaster film Dante's Peak.  He has worked twice each with actors Kevin Costner, Pierce Brosnan, Anthony Hopkins and Michael Madsen. Also worked with actors Tom Cruise, Liam Neeson, Daniel Day-Lewis, Bruce Greenwood, Dexter Fletcher, Bernard Hill, Laurence Olivier, Edward Fox, Al Pacino and many more.

Life and career
Donaldson was born in Ballarat, Victoria, Australia where he attended Ballarat High School. At 20, in 1965 he emigrated to New Zealand, where he established a small still photography business and began making advertisements. Donaldson was also directing documentaries, including an adventure series featuring Everest-conquering New Zealander Sir Edmund Hillary, and his first ventures into drama. Donaldson and actor/director Ian Mune collaborated on a number of projects for television, including anthology series Winners and Losers, based on short stories by New Zealand authors.

In 1976, Donaldson directed and produced his first feature Sleeping Dogs. The film starred Mune and Sam Neill as two men fighting for their lives in a totalitarian New Zealand. He followed it with Smash Palace, starring Bruno Lawrence as a man who kidnaps his daughter after his marriage disintegrates.

Donaldson's international break came when producer Dino de Laurentiis invited him to direct a version of Mutiny on the Bounty,  after Lawrence of Arabia director David Lean left the project. The film, released as The Bounty, starred Anthony Hopkins as William Bligh and Mel Gibson as mutineer Fletcher Christian. Donaldson was nominated for a Golden Palm at the 1984 Cannes Film Festival for this film.

Donaldson went on to direct many popular and successful movies, including his breakthrough American hit thriller No Way Out (starring Kevin Costner and Gene Hackman), barmen romp Cocktail (starring Bryan Brown and Tom Cruise), volcano disaster movie Dante's Peak (starring Pierce Brosnan and Linda Hamilton), and Thirteen Days (starring Kevin Costner), an account of the Cuban Missile Crisis. He also directed science fiction tale Species, and in 2003, the Al Pacino and Colin Farrell film The Recruit. He also wrote and directed The World's Fastest Indian starring Anthony Hopkins and depicting Burt Munro's successful attempts at motorcycle speed records at Bonneville Salt Flats in the 1950's. The film was released in 2005.

His son Chris has represented New Zealand at Olympic level in athletics in the 100 m and 200 m events.

In the 2018 Queen's Birthday Honours, Donaldson was appointed an Officer of the New Zealand Order of Merit, for services to film.

Filmography

Film

Documentary film

Short film
 Lawyers (2010)

Television
TV series

TV movies
 Survey (1972)
 Jocko (1981)

References

External links
 

1945 births
Australian emigrants to New Zealand
Living people
New Zealand film directors
Officers of the New Zealand Order of Merit
People educated at Ballarat High School
Science fiction film directors